Rob Elliott (born 8 October 1965 in Brisbane, Queensland) is an Australian radio announcer and television show host, best known for hosting Wheel of Fortune in January 1997 - December 2003.

Television career
His first TV job was the children's TV program OK for Kids in Brisbane on Channel 9. Then became the Melbourne-based reporter for Wombat for the Seven Network during the 1980s. Had several parts in Neighbours and in 1996, he became host of Talking Telephone Numbers (based on a UK format) for the Seven Network.  During the mid to late 80s he also worked for Brisbane Radio Station, 1008AM "Stereo 10" as a radio announcer and Geelong's 93.9 Bay FM / 3XY in the early '90s.

His best-known role was as the host of Wheel of Fortune from 1997 to 2003, replacing Tony Barber who replaced John Burgess for a very short time. After being fired from the show, Elliott created a board game called Smart Ass. He explained, I used to play Trivial Pursuit and never won - I hated it. I created a game I could win. In 2017, he became involved in a legal dispute with Sale of the Century champion Cary Young, who wrote questions for Smart Ass.

References

External links

Australian game show hosts
1965 births
Living people
People from Brisbane